HPFC may refer to:
Hourly Price Forward Curve
Hanover Park F.C.
Harwich & Parkeston F.C.
High Performance FC
High Performance Fuzzy Computing
Highlands Park F.C.